Suolojávri is a lake which lies in Lebesby Municipality in Troms og Finnmark county, Norway. The  lake lies on the Sværholt Peninsula, about halfway between the villages of Børselv and Kunes.

See also
List of lakes in Norway

References

Lebesby
Lakes of Troms og Finnmark